Jacques Dupin (4 March 1927, Privas, Ardèche – 27 October 2012, Paris) was a French poet, art critic, and co-founder of the journal L'éphemère.

Dupin was born in the town of Privas in the South of France, where his father was a psychiatrist at a state mental hospital. In 1944, the family moved to Paris, where, in 1950, the poet René Char helped him publish his first collection of poems.

In 1966, he co-founded the poetry quarterly L’Éphémère, with poets including André du Bouchet, Yves Bonnefoy and Paul Celan.

He was the director of publication at Galerie Maeght, which represented Joan Miró, a close friend. The gallery also represented Marc Chagall, Alberto Giacometti, Francis Bacon and Wassily Kandinsky. Giacometti and Bacon both painted his portrait.

Dupin wrote Miró's biography, numerous monographs on the artist's work, and was empowered by Miró's family to be the sole authenticating authority of the artist's work; a role that made him much sought after by collectors. In 1987, Dupin was the curator of a retrospective of Miró's work at the Solomon R. Guggenheim Museum, the first such retrospective in New York since 1959.

Jacques Dupin's poetry in English 

 Of Flies and Monkeys, translated by John Taylor, The Bitter Oleander Press, September 2011
 Selected Poems, selected by Paul Auster, translated by Stephen Romer and David Shapiro, Bloodaxe Books, 1992
 Selected Poems, Wake Forest University Press, November 1992
 Fits and Starts: Selected Poems of Jacques Dupin, translated by Paul Auster, Living Hand Editions, 1974

Jacques Dupin's poetry in French 

 Cendrier du voyage, GLM, Paris, 1950
 Art poétique, PAB, Alès, 1956
 Les Brisants, GLM, Paris, 1958
 L'Épervier, GLM, Paris, 1960
 Gravir, Gallimard, Paris, 1963
 L'embrasure, Gallimard, Paris, 1969
 Dehors, Gallimard, Paris, 1975
 Ballast, Le Collet de Buffle, Paris, 1976
 Histoire de la lumière, L'Ire des Vents, Paris, 1978
 De nul lieu et du Japon, Éditions Fata Morgana, Montpellier, 1981
 Le Désœuvrement, Orange export Ltd, 1982
 Une Apparence de soupirail, Gallimard, Paris, 1982
 De singes et de mouches, Éditions Fata Morgana, Montpellier, 1983
 Les Mères, Fata Morgana, Montpellier, 1986
 Contumace, POL, Paris, 1986
 Chansons troglodytes, Éditions Fata Morgana, Montpellier, 1989
 Rien encore, tout déjà, Éditions Fata Morgana, Montpellier, 1991
 Echancré, POL, Paris, 1991
 Eclisse, Spectres familiers, Marseille, 1992
 Le grésil, POL, Paris, 1996
 Ecart, POL, Paris, 2000
 De singes et de mouches suivi de Les mères (réédition), POL, Paris, 2001
 Coudrier, POL, Paris, 2006

Jacques Dupin's essays on modern art 

 Joan Miro, Flammarion, Paris, 1961 (New augmented edition augmentée 1993)
 Textes pour une approche sur Alberto Giacometti, Maeght éditeur, 1962 (new edition in 1991, éditions Fourbis)
 Matière du souffle (sur Antoni Tàpies), Fourbis, Paris, 1994
 L'espace autrement dit, Editions Galilée, Paris, 1982
 Claude Garache, Dessins, Paris, Conférence et Adam Biro éditeurs, 1999

References

Further reading
Jacques Dupin. Profile by Claude Esteban at Poetry International Web.
The Cruel Geography of Jacques Dupin's Poetry by Paul Auster in Books Abroad.

1927 births
2012 deaths
People from Privas
French biographers
French art critics
French male essayists
French male poets
20th-century French poets
20th-century biographers
20th-century French essayists
20th-century French male writers
Male biographers